"Edith's Crisis of Faith" is a two-part episode of the U.S. sitcom All in the Family. It aired as the 13th and 14th episodes of season 8 in 1977.

Production 
The episode saw the third and final appearance of Beverly LaSalle (played by Lori Shannon), after "Archie the Hero" (where Archie Bunker saves her life) and “Beverly Rides Again” (where she invites the Bunkers out to dinner).

Plot 
Beverly LaSalle, a transvestite and good friend of Edith, is mugged alongside Mike a few days before Christmas (the result of a gay bashing). Mike survives the ordeal with only minor injuries, but Beverly is killed. Edith Bunker has a crisis of faith and begins to wonder how God would allow people to punish one of his children. She believes that all people are worthy of love and feels a sense of loss and sadness at the tragic event, and doesn't understand it.

Critical reception and analysis 
Pop Matters thought this episode highlighted the "social stigma against trans persons, an act of injustice emphasized by Edith's inability to understand humanity's rejection of people like her dear friend." NewNowNext thought the storyline was groundbreaking for 1975 and even by 2016 standards. The Queer Encyclopedia of Film and Television deemed the episode "daring and disturbing". DVDTalk notes that while Edith notes that while Beverly was killed because of "who she was", the episode is coy about defining what that is, and argues that an earlier episode would have hit the gay-bashing aspect of this violent crime head on. The Age of Netflix argues that by choosing to air both parts of the episode on Christmas night 1977, the episode " massively recalibrates the episode's affective stakes" by forcing viewers to associate the holiday with a time to "(mourn) queer loss".

References  

1977 American television episodes
All in the Family episodes
American LGBT-related television episodes
American Christmas television episodes
Television episodes about murder